A binbashi, alternatively bimbashi, (from , "chief of a thousand", "chiliarch") is a major in the Turkish army, of which term originated in the Ottoman army. The title was also used for a major in the Khedivial Egyptian army as Bimbashi (1805–1953). It was also used by the Serbian revolutionaries as Bimbaša in 1804–1817.

Since the restructuring of the modern Turkish Army in 1934, Binbaşı means major; but in the Ottoman Army (and in the pre-1934 Turkish Army, during the early years of the Turkish Republic) the more correct equivalent of the Western rank "major" was Kolağası (senior captain), which ranked above Yüzbaşı (captain) and below Binbaşı. 

When the rank Kolağası was removed from the Turkish Army in 1934, the rank Binbaşı was relegated to major (before 1934, the rank Binbaşı was also considered an equivalent of lieutenant colonel.) Until 1934, it was the duty of a Binbaşı to command a battalion (tabur) in the Ottoman (and pre-1934 Turkish) armies; but since 1934, it is the duty of a Yarbay (lieutenant colonel) to command a battalion.

The collar mark (later shoulder mark) and cap of a Binbaşı had two stripes and one star during the early years of the Turkish Republic.

See also
 Military of the Ottoman Empire
 Turkish Army

References
 Dictionary.com, Binbashi entry
 Dunn, John P. "Khedive Ismail's Army" Routledge Press, 2005, p. 156 

Military ranks of Turkey
Turkish words and phrases
Military ranks of the Ottoman Empire

tr:Binbaşı